The  occurred on the morning of 28 May 2019 in the Tama ward of Kawasaki City, Kanagawa Prefecture, Japan, four blocks west of Noborito Station. Two people were murdered, and 18 others were injured after being stabbed at a city bus stop by 51-year-old Ryuichi Iwasaki (岩崎隆一 Iwasaki Ryūichi). After carrying out the attack, Iwasaki committed suicide by stabbing himself in the neck.

Incident 
Kawasaki city fire department said it received an emergency call at 7:44 a.m. JST, and responded to an incident in which a man attacked students waiting at a bus stop with yanagi ba, long and thin knives used in Japanese cuisine to prepare sashimi and nigiri sushi, in both hands. The students targeted were identified by the NHK public broadcaster as all being girls. A bus driver who witnessed the attack claimed that they saw the man holding two knives and he had walked towards the bus before stabbing the children. Authorities told reporters the man attacked people randomly as they lined up to enter the bus.

The Kawasaki Fire Department reported that sixteen elementary school students from Caritas Elementary School, a private Catholic school, and three adults were injured in the attack, separately from the suspect.

Perpetrator 
Ryuichi Iwasaki, a 51-year-old man suspected of carrying out the attack, was believed to be a resident of Kawasaki's Asao ward. He was found lying on the ground of the scene, bleeding from a self-inflicted stab wound to the neck. The two  bloodied sashimi knives were found nearby, and two more knives, a  all-purpose knife and a  sashimi bōchō were found in a backpack that had been in his possession and dropped at a nearby FamilyMart. The suspect was transported to a local hospital, where he was pronounced dead.

Iwasaki was an unemployed hikikomori, which is someone who takes withdrawing from society to an extreme. He was living in his elderly uncle's home. Before the incident, he had a dispute with his neighbors but would not talk with his uncle about what had happened.

Victims
The deceased were identified as Hanako Kuribayashi, an 11-year-old student, and Satoshi Oyama, a 39-year-old Foreign Ministry employee who worked primarily as a diplomat to Myanmar.

See also 

Etajima stabbings
Osaka school massacre
Shimonoseki Station massacre

References

2019 murders in Japan
Crime in Kanagawa Prefecture
Crimes against children
Deaths by stabbing in Japan
History of Kanagawa Prefecture
Kawasaki, Kanagawa
Knife attacks
Mass stabbings in Japan
May 2019 crimes in Asia
Murder–suicides in Japan
Stabbing attacks in 2019
Suicides by sharp instrument in Japan
21st century in Kawasaki, Kanagawa